Evelyn M. Bowles (April 22, 1921 – April 8, 2016) was an American politician and teacher.

Biography 
Born in Worden, Illinois, Bowles served in the United States Coast Guard Women's Reserve (SPAR) Intelligence Division during World War II. She went to Greenville College, Illinois State University, Southern Illinois University and was an elementary school teacher. Bowles lived in Edwardsville, Illinois. From 1975 to 1994, Bowles served as the county clerk for Madison County, Illinois and was a Democrat. She was appointed to the Illinois Senate in 1994 after the incumbent Sam M. Vadalabene died while still in office and served until 2003. Bowles died in Edwardsville, Illinois.

Preservation of Cahokia Mounds 
In 2000, Bowles was the recipient of the Illinois Archaeology Public Service Award for her work in securing protection for more land on the site of the Cahokia Mounds, specifically the Sugarloaf property.

State Senator Evelyn M. Bowles wrote about the Cahokia Mounds site:Through the years my friends and I made occasional Sunday afternoon trips to the Mounds. When I became the State Senator, it afforded me the opportunity to secure funds for the acquisition of additional acreage in which there are smaller Mounds. Many of these have contained additional artifacts.In 2005, Bowles presented a grant of $250,000 to the Cahokia Mounds Museum Society's Land Acquisition Committee to secure land surrounding the State Park Place area. These funds were used to purchase 44 new lots, including 3 mounds.

Notes

External links

1921 births
2016 deaths
People from Edwardsville, Illinois
Military personnel from Illinois
Greenville College people
Illinois State University alumni
Southern Illinois University alumni
Educators from Illinois
Women state legislators in Illinois
County clerks in Illinois
Democratic Party Illinois state senators
20th-century American educators
20th-century American women educators
20th-century American politicians
20th-century American women politicians
21st-century American politicians
21st-century American women politicians
United States Coast Guard personnel of World War II